Keriq-e Bozorg (also Romanized as Kerīq-e Bozorg; also known as Karan-e Bozorg, Karī Bozorg, and Karī-ye Bozorg) is a village in Yurchi-ye Gharbi Rural District, Kuraim District, Nir County, Ardabil Province, Iran. At the 2006 census, its population was 163, in 39 families.

References 

Tageo

Towns and villages in Nir County